Dante is a combination of software, hardware, and network protocols that delivers uncompressed, multi-channel, low-latency digital audio over a standard Ethernet network using Layer 3 IP packets. Developed in 2006 by a Sydney-based company named Audinate, Dante builds on previous audio over Ethernet and audio over IP technologies.

Like most other audio over Ethernet technologies, Dante is primarily for professional, commercial applications.  Most often, it is used in applications where a large number of audio channels must be transmitted over relatively long distances or to multiple locations.

Digital audio provides several advantages over traditional analog audio distribution. Audio transmitted over analog cables can be adversely affected by signal degradation due to electromagnetic interference, high-frequency attenuation, and voltage drop over long cable runs.  Thanks to digital multiplexing, the cabling requirements for digital audio distribution are almost always reduced when compared to analog audio. Dante also provides specific advantages over first-generation audio over Ethernet technologies, such as CobraNet and EtherSound.  Technological advancements include native gigabit support, higher channel count, lower latency, and automatic configuration.

History

After Motorola closed an Australian research facility in 2003, current Audinate CEO Aidan Williams brought a team of researchers to the National Information and Communication Technology Australia (NICTA) research centre in Sydney, Australia.  There, with the help of government funding, the team spent three years developing the foundations of Dante.  In 2006, Williams founded Audinate and began the process of bringing Dante to the market.

Audinate received funding from NICTA until negotiations concluded in 2006, at which point Audinate became NICTA's first successful spin-out company.  Since 2006, Audinate has also secured two rounds of A$4 million investments led by venture capital firms Starfish Ventures and Innovation Capital.  In 2009, Audinate established an office in Portland, Oregon and named Lee Ellison as CEO. Audinate also has offices in Cambridge (UK) and Hong Kong.

 Audinate has licensed 350 companies, which have produced over 3000 products that incorporate Dante technology.

Platforms
Audinate offers Dante technology on a number of hardware and software platforms.
Virtual soundcard – software interface for PC and Mac
Brooklyn II – medium channel count module, Gigabit Ethernet
Ultimo – low channel count microcontroller, Fast Ethernet
Dante HC – high channel count FPGA, Gigabit Ethernet
Broadway – low channel count FPGA, Gigabit Ethernet
Dante Domain Manager – network management platform

Third-party software and hardware companies that sell Dante solutions must license it from Audinate.

Notes

References

External links 
 

Digital audio
Audio network protocols
Ethernet